Zakhele Manyatsi (born 7 September 1980) is a Swaziland international footballer who plays as a defender. As of January 2010, he plays for Royal Leopards in the Swazi Premier League and has won 12 caps for his country.

External links

1980 births
Living people
Swazi footballers
Eswatini international footballers
Royal Leopards F.C. players
Association footballers not categorized by position